Longdong may refer to:

 Longdong Stream Salamander, species native to Sichuan
The following entries are written as "" unless otherwise noted:
 Longdong, Hunan, town in Xiangxiang
 Longdong Township, Chongqing, in Yunyang County
 Longdong Township, Sichuan, in Cangxi County
 Longdong Subdistrict, Guangzhou, in Tianhe District
 Longdong Subdistrict, Tangshan (龙东街道), in Lubei District, Tangshan, Hebei
 Longdong Subdistrict, Jiaozuo, in Zhongzhan District, Jiaozuo, Henan
 Longdong Subdistrict, Jinan, in Lixia District, Jinan, Shandong